Wellington Pinto Fraga (born 20 January 1982 in Cachoeiras de Macacu, Rio de Janeiro) is a Brazilian footballer who plays as a midfielder.

Football career
Wellington was signed by Internazionale in summer 2002. He was loaned to satellite club Spezia in 2003/04 season, and left for Vis Pesaro and A.C. Sansovino in 2004/05.

In summer 2005, he was signed by FC Chiasso.

After released by Chiasso in June 2007, he signed a 6-month contract with Grêmio Jaciara in January 2008. In June 2008, he signed a 1-year contract with União (MT). In July 2009 he left for Riostrense.

External links
 Brazilian FA archive
 Swiss Football League

Brazilian footballers
Brazilian expatriate footballers
Association football wingers
Swiss Challenge League players
CR Vasco da Gama players
Inter Milan players
Spezia Calcio players
Vis Pesaro dal 1898 players
FC Chiasso players
Yverdon-Sport FC players
Expatriate footballers in Italy
Expatriate footballers in Switzerland
Sportspeople from Rio de Janeiro (state)
1982 births
Living people
União Esporte Clube players